Cereopsius niassensis is a species of beetle in the family Cerambycidae. It was described by Lansberge in 1883.

References

Cereopsius
Beetles described in 1883